Gregory Stone may refer to 
Gregory S. Stone (born 1957), an American biologist
Gregory L. Stone, the American Air Force captain murdered by fellow-soldier Hasan K. Akbar
Greg Stone (born 1961), Australian actor, birthname Gregory
Gregory Stone (composer) (1900-1991), film composer, see Academy Award for Best Original Score